The Masonic Temple in Richmond, Virginia is a Richardsonian Romanesque style building built during 1888–1893, designed by Jackson C. Gott.  The building was listed on the National Register of Historic Places in 1983.

It is a prominent building in downtown Richmond.

Its NRHP nomination asserts that the building is the finest example of Richardsonian Romanesque style architecture in the state, and others have asserted that at its time of construction it was "one of the 'most magnificent examples of modern architecture in the South.'"

The design by Gott was one of 17 submitted in a design competition.

The building was used for a 1905 function attended by U.S. President Theodore Roosevelt.  It was used by the Masons until 1971. In 1982 the Richmond Foundation for the Arts acquired it with intended purpose of its serving as an arts center for the region.

At some later date the building housed a catering venue, office building and apartments.

See also
Mason's Hall (Richmond, Virginia), also NRHP-listed

References

Clubhouses on the National Register of Historic Places in Virginia
National Register of Historic Places in Richmond, Virginia
Masonic buildings completed in 1893
Buildings and structures in Richmond, Virginia
Former Masonic buildings in Virginia
Richardsonian Romanesque architecture in Virginia
Historic district contributing properties in Virginia